Theodore H. Schwartz (born in New York City) is an American medical scientist, academic physician and neurosurgeon.
  
Schwartz specializes in surgery for brain tumors, pituitary tumors and epilepsy.  He is particularly known for developing and expanding the field of minimally-invasive endonasal endoscopic skull base and pituitary surgery and for his research on neurovascular coupling and propagation of epilepsy.

Schwartz is a Professor of Neurosurgery, Otolaryngology & Neuroscience  and the Director of Surgical Neuro-Oncology, Epilepsy & Pituitary Surgery at Weill Cornell Medical College, New York Presbyterian Hospital.  In 2014, Schwartz received the first endowed professorship in the Department of Neurosurgery at Weill Cornell Medical College being named the David and Ursel Barnes Professor of Minimally Invasive Neurosurgery. He is the Director of the Institute for Minimally Invasive Skull Base and Pituitary Surgery Program and the Director of the Epilepsy Research Laboratory in The Department of Neurosurgery  investigating brain mapping, neurovascular coupling  and other novel techniques  for imaging and treating epilepsy.  This epilepsy research laboratory, which is now part of the newly developed Brain and Mind Research Institute at Weill Cornell Medical College, has been funded with K08, R21 and R01 grants  by the National Institute of Neurological Disorders and Stroke  - a research institute of the National Institutes of Health - and several private organizations.  Schwartz has served as a standing member of the NINDS NSD-C Grant Review Committee  and also serves on the editorial boards of the Journal of Neurosurgery and World Neurosurgery.

Biography 

Theodore Schwartz graduated magna cum laude with dual undergraduate Bachelor of Arts degrees in Philosophy and English from Harvard University in 1987.  While in attendance at Harvard, he received the John Harvard Scholarship for Academic Achievement from 1985 to 1987 and was awarded the Hoopes Prize for his senior thesis.  Schwartz then went on to graduate magna cum laude from Harvard University Medical School in 1990.  After completing his residency and chief residency in neurosurgery at the Neurological Institute of New York at Columbia University Medical Center, Schwartz completed advanced fellowship training at Yale-New Haven Hospital in the surgical treatment of brain tumors and epilepsy.  He was awarded the American Association of Neurological Surgeons Van Wagenen Fellowship named after William P. Van Wagenen, a charter member of the Harvey Cushing Society.  He was further recognized by the German government when he was awarded the Von Humboldt Fellowship from the Alexander von Humboldt Foundation.

Schwartz has provided commentary to the media on his neurosurgical expertise. This has included the broadcast news organizations of ABC, NBC and CBS. He has also been a guest on the Larry King Live television show. His expertise has also been sought through interviews - quoted and published - in the Wall Street Journal, The New York Post, The New York Daily News, and Crain's New York Business.  Schwartz lectures and presents his surgical techniques to other neurosurgeons and ENT surgeons around the world.

Society memberships

In addition to serving as Professor of Neurosurgery, Otolaryngology, Neurology and Neuroscience at Weill Cornell Medical College, Schwartz is a member of several professional societies including: American Medical Association (1993); New York Medical Society (1994); Congress of Neurological Surgery (1995); American Association of Neurological Surgery (1995); American Epilepsy Society (1997); Society for Neuroscience (1997); Society for Neuro-oncology (1998); American College of Surgeons (2003); New York Society for Neurosurgery (2003);The Medical Strollers (2005); Physician's Scientific Society (2005); North American Skull Base Society (2005); The Hospital Graduates (2007); Cornell Alumni Council(2008); Neurosurgical Society of America (2008); Institute for Biomedical Imaging Sciences (2008); International Society for Pituitary Surgeons (2010); American Academy of Neurological Surgery (2010).

Honors and awards 

Junior Investigator Award, American Epilepsy Society (1997)
Young Clinical Investigators Award, NREF, AANS  (2001-2002)
The Dana Foundation Program in Clinical Imaging Award  (2002-2005)
George Ehni Lectureship, Visiting Professor, Baylor School of Medicine (2008)
The New York Times New York SuperDoctors  (2008-2013)
New York Magazine Top Doctors, New York Metro Area, Castle Connolly  (2008–13)
U.S. News & World Report  (2008-2013)
America's Top Surgeons (2009-2013)
Best Doctors in America (2009-2013)
Pituitary Network Association's Gentle Giant Award (2013)
Visiting Professorships/Honored Guest Lectureships (National): University of California, Los Angeles, Stanford University, Baylor College of Medicine, Massachusetts General Hospital, University of Rochester, Johns Hopkins School of Medicine, University of Pennsylvania, Barrow Neurological Institute, Thomas Jefferson University, University of Michigan, North Shore-LIJ Health System, Yale University
Visiting Professorships/Honored Guest Lectureships (International): St Catherine's College; Dr. Balabhai Nanavati Hospital, Mumbai, India; Sheffield Medical School; Mexican Neurosurgical Congress; Neurosurgical Department of Changzheng Hospital, Shanghai, China; Society of British Neurological Surgeons at the Aberdeen Royal Infirmary - based at the Royal College of Surgeons of England; National University Health System, Dept. of Neurosurgery, Singapore; Rhinology Meeting, São Paulo Brazil; International Epilepsy Congress, Montreal, Canada

Video gallery

Selected publications 

To date, Schwartz has co-authored more than 175 research articles, 65 book chapters, as well as co-editing two neurosurgical textbooks on the subject of endoscopic surgery.

Books 

Neurovascular Coupling Methods.  Mingrui Zhao (Author/Editor), Hongtao Ma (Author/Editor),Theodore H. Schwartz (Author/Editor). Humana Press. New York, NY; Publication Date: August 1, 2014.   | 
Practical Endoscopic Skull Base Surgery.  Vijay K. Anand (Author/Editor), Theodore H. Schwartz (Author/Editor). Plural Pub. San Diego, CA; Publication Date: April 15, 2007.   | 
Endoscopic Pituitary Surgery:  Endocrine, Neuro-Ophthalmologic and Surgical Management. Theodore H. Schwartz (Editor), Vijay K. Anand (Editor).  Thieme, New York; Publication Date: November 23, 2011 |  |

Book chapters 

Nyquist GG, Anand VK, Schwartz TH. Chapter 20 - "Transplanum, Transtuberculum Approach" in Transnasal Endoscopic Skull Base and Brain Surgery: Tips and Pearls. Stamm A. (Editor); Thieme, New York, pp 193–200; Publication Date: August 24, 2011 |  | 
Singh A, Anand VK, Schwartz TH.  Chapter 47 - "Successful Management of Endoscopic Skull Base Surgery Complications" in Transnasal Endoscopic Skull Base and Brain Surgery: Tips and Pearls. Stamm A. (Editor); Thieme, New York, pp 396–401; Publication Date: August 24, 2011 |  | 
Fraser JF, Anand VK, Schwartz TH.  Chapter 46 - "Endoscopic Transsphenoidal Approach" in Core Techniques in Operative Neurosurgery.  Jandial R. (Author), McCormick P. (Author), Black P. (Author); Elsevier, Philadelphia, PA, pp 328–338; Publication Date: April 25, 2011 |  | 
Souweidane MM, Greenfield JP, Schwartz TH. Chapter 29 - "Endoscopic Approach to Intraventricular Brain Tumors" in Schmidek and Sweet: Operative Neurosurgical Techniques: Indications, Methods and Results, 6th edition. Quinones-Hinojosa A. (Editor); Elsevier, Philadelphia, PA, pp 351–356;  Publication Date: July 6, 2012 |  | 
Moshel YA, Anand VK, Hartl R, Schwartz TH.  Chapter 26 - "Extended Endonasal Approaches to the Craniovertebral Junction" in Surgery of the Craniovertebral Junction, 2nd edition.  Bambakidis N, Dickman C, Spetzler R, Sonntag V (Editors); Thieme, New York;  Publication Date: June 15, 2012 |  |

Research articles - Epilepsy 

Schwartz TH, Bonhoeffer T.;  In vivo optical mapping of epileptic foci and surround inhibition in ferret cerebral cortex.  Nat Med. (2001) Sep; 7(9): 1063–67. . 
Suh M., Bahar S., Mehta AD, Schwartz TH; Temporal dependence in uncoupling of blood volume and oxygenation during interictal epileptiform events in rat neocortex.  J Neuroscience (2005) Jan 5; 25(1): 68–77. . 
Suh M., Bahar S., Mehta AD, Schwartz TH; Blood volume and hemoglobin oxygenation response following electrical stimulation of human cortex.  Neuroimage (2006) May 15; 31(1): 66–75. . 
Zhao M., Suh M., Ma H., Perry C., Geneslaw A., Schwart TH; Focal increases in perfusion and decreases in hemoglobin oxygenation precede seizure onset in spontaneous human epilepsy.  Epilepsia (2007) Nov; 48(11): 2059–67. . 
Zhao M., Ma H., Suh M., Schwartz TH; Spatiotemporal dynamics of perfusion and oximetry during ictal discharges in the rat neocortex.  J Neuroscience (2009) Mar 4; 29(9): 2814–23.  . 
Ma H., Zhao M., Suh M., Schwartz TH; Hemodynamic surrogates for excitatory membrane potential change during interictal epileptiform events in rat neocortex. J Neurophysiology (2009) May; 101(5): 2550–62. . 
Ma H., Geneslaw A., Zhao M., Suh M., Perry C., Schwartz TH; The importance of latency in the focality of perfusion and oxygenation changes associated with triggered afterdischarges in human cortex.  J Cereb Blood Flow Metab (2009) May; 29(5): 1003–14.  . 
Geneslaw AS, Zhao M., Ma H., Schwartz TH; Tissue hypoxia correlates with intensity of interictal spikes. J Cereb Blood Flow Metab (2011) June; 31(6): 1394–402. . 
Zhao M., Nguyen J., Ma H., Nishimura N., Schaeffer CB, Schwartz TH; Preictal and ictal neurovascular and metabolic coupling surrounding a seizure focus.  J Neuroscience (2011) Sep 14; 31(37) 13292–300. . 
Ma H., Zhao M., Schwartz TH; Dynamic neurovascular coupling and uncoupling during ictal onset, propagation, and termination revealed by simultaneous in vivo optical imaging of neural activity and local blood volume.  Cereb Cortex (2013) Apr; 23(4) 885–99.  .

Research articles - Endoscopic skull base surgery 

Laufer I., Anand VK, Schwartz TH; Endoscopic, endonasal extended transsphenoidal, transplanum transtuberculum approach for resection of suprasellar lesions.  J Neurosurg (2007) Mar; 106(3): 400–6. . 
Leng LZ, Brown S., Anand VK, Schwartz TH; "Gasket-seal" watertight closure in minimal-access endoscopic cranial base surgery.  Neurosurgery (2008) May; 62(5 Suppl 2): ONSE 342–3.  . 
Schwartz TH, Fraser JF, Brown S., Tabaee A., Kacker A., Anand VK;  Endoscopic cranial base surgery: classification of operative approaches.  Neurosurgery (2008) May; 62(5): 991–1002. . 
Fraser JF, Nyquist GG, Moore N., Anand VK, Schwartz TH; Endoscopic endonasal transclival resection of chordomas: operative technique, clinical outcome, and review of the literature. J Neurosurg (2010) May; 112(5): 1061–9. . 
Hofstetter CP, Singh A., Anand VK, Kacker A., Schwartz TH; The endoscopic, endonasal, transmaxillary transpterygoid approach to the pterygopalatine fossa, infratemporal fossa, petrous apex, and the Meckel cave.  J Neurosurg (2010) Nov; 113(5): 967–74.  .

See also 

 List of surgeons
 Cornell faculty

References

External links
Weill Cornell Medical College physician website at Weill Cornell Medical College
Institute of Minimally Invasive Skull Base & Pituitary Surgery website videos Drs. Schwartz and Anand
 Castle Connolly/Top Doctors - Theodore H. Schwartz, MD, FACS
Neurovascular Coupling & Epilepsy - Schwartz, TH American Epilepsy Society
Stroud Science Symposium at the Kingswood Oxford School - guest speaker (2012) Dr. Theodore H. Schwartz

1965 births
Living people
Cornell University faculty
American medical academics
American medical researchers
Harvard Medical School alumni
American neurosurgeons
American neuroscientists
Physicians from New York City
Scientists from New York City
Articles containing video clips